The 2021 Vizianagaram Municipal Corporation election is going to be held on 10 March 2021 to elect members to all 50 wards of the municipal corporation.

Election schedule

Results By Ward

References

2021 local elections in Andhra Pradesh
Vizianagaram
Vizianagaram